Twinning is a VH1 reality show that premiered on July 22, 2015. It features twelve sets of identical twins, testing their “twin-tuition” in mental and physical challenges. The show is hosted by Angie Greenup. Shawn and Claire Buitendorp were the winners of Season 1. Yet there has not been official word of renewal nor cancellation, it is safe to say it is on an indefinite hiatus.

Episode format

During the competition, all contestants were housed in two adjacent houses, one green, one blue. One of each pair of twins lived in the green house, while the other lived in the blue house, keeping everyone separated from their twin.

Each week, there was a "Double-Down Challenge", a game that tested physical or mental abilities. The nature of the challenges varied each week, but mostly required coordination between pairs of twins without direct communication. After each challenge, the highest-scoring twin pairs won the right to move freely between the two houses for a limited time, allowing them visit their twins. The winning twins were also allowed to vote for two pairs of twins to enter the "Twin-Off".

At the end of each week, two pairs of twins were pitted against each other in a "Twin-Off". During the Twin-Off, contestants were asked questions about personal opinions or preferences without being allowed to communicate. If a pair of twins gave the same answer, they score a point, and the first pair to score five points wins the Twin-Off and are allowed to remain in the competition, while the losers of the Twin-Off were eliminated.

Season 1 Cast

Episode progress

Notes
 WINNER: The set of twins won the final Twin-Off and Twinning.
 RUNNERS-UP: The set of twins lost the final Twin-Off and was the Runner-Up team.
 WIN: The set of twins won the challenge.
 TWIN-OFF: The set of twins was voted into the Twin-Off and won.
 TWIN-OFF: The set of twins was voted into the Twin-Off but didn't have to compete due to a team getting sent home.
 ELIM: The set of twins was eliminated at the Twin-Off.
 ILL: The set of twins was removed from the competition due to illness.

Top color is for the first contestant, and bottom color is for the second contestant listed. The column which is not blue or green is the color of their team during the challenges.

In episode 4, Torian & Tre pulled a prank on the houseguests by switching houses when they weren't one of the winning teams. Therefore, host Angie said that they were forced to switch houses.

Episode 4 ended in with a fight between Kristina and Ji & Le. In episode 5, Host Angie asked all the twins to gather in one house, and asked them if anyone wanted Ji & Le or Kristina & Kamila to be sent home. They all agreed that both teams should stay in the house. The game went on with the Twin-Off between Kristina & Kamila and Dylan & Taylor.

In Episode 5, Bennett was sent to the ER after the producers thought he needed medical attention after a severe headache and fever. Therefore, Winston voted by himself.

In Episode 7, the twin-off was cancelled after Bennett was deemed too sick to continue in the competition. As a result, Winston was forced to leave the house and therefore the team was medically unable to continue.

In Episode 11, Shawn & Claire won the final challenge, sending Torian & Tre and Kristina & Kamila into the semi-final Twin-Off.  After Torian & Tre defeated Kristina & Kamila, they faced Shawn & Claire in the final Twin-Off.

Episodes

Other Appearances
Shawn & Claire competed on Project Runway (season 16) in 2017, Shawn finished in 10th place and Claire finished in 9th place.
Skylar & Spencer competed on the Sixteenth Season of Worst Cooks in America in 2018, Skylar finished in 12th place and Spencer finished in 9th place.

References

External links
 Official Website

VH1 original programming
2010s American reality television series
2015 American television series debuts
2015 American television series endings
English-language television shows